General elections were held in Romania on 26 November 2000, with a second round of the presidential election on 10 December. Former president Ion Iliescu of the Social Democracy Party of Romania (PDSR) was re-elected in the run-off, whilst the PDSR, as part of the Social Democratic Pole of Romania, emerged as the largest party in Parliament, winning 155 of the 345 seats in the Chamber of Deputies and 65 of the 140 seats in the Senate.

Presidential candidates

Results

President

In the second round, Theodor Stolojan, Mugur Isărescu, György Frunda, and Petre Roman positioned against Corneliu Vadim Tudor, without openly endorsing Ion Iliescu.

Parliament

Senate
The alliance named Social Democratic Pole of Romania was formed by PDSR, PSDR (2 senators), and PUR (4 senator). On 16 June 2001, PDSR and PSDR merged, forming the present-day PSD.

Chamber of Deputies
The Social Democratic Pole of Romania included the PDSR, PSDR (10 deputies), and PUR (6 deputies). On 16 June 2001, PDSR and PSDR merged, forming the present-day PSD.

Gallery

References

2000
2000 elections in Romania
Presidential election
2000
November 2000 events in Europe
December 2000 events in Europe